The U.S. Classic is an annual summer gymnastics meet for elite artistic gymnasts of the United States. The meet occurs before Nationals and is a qualifier for it. In Olympic years, the aforementioned meets along with the U.S. Olympic Trials are used for selection to the team.

Background 
Previously only women had competed in the event. Men, both junior and senior, will compete for the first time in 2022.

The senior all-around winners of the U.S. Classic include Dominique Dawes (1993), Nastia Liukin (2005), and Aly Raisman (2011, 2012, 2016).

Past champions
Following is a list of past senior elite and junior elite champions of the U.S. Classic:

Sponsorships
In recent years the U.S. Classic has been sponsored by various companies, and the event is typically named for the sponsoring company. Below is a list of past and present sponsors of the event, as well as the official name of the event during the period of sponsorship:

See also
American Cup
Winter Cup
USA Gymnastics National Championships
Olympic Trials

References

External links
 Secret U.S. Classic official website

 
Artistic gymnastics competitions
Gymnastics competitions in the United States
Women's gymnastics